Phenomenal and the Treasure of Tutankhamen is a 1968 Italian film directed by Ruggero Deodato. The film was produced by and starred Nicola Mauro Parenti as Fenomenal, a masked superhero who attempts to stop the theft of the mask of Tutankhamun from a museum in Paris.

Cast
 Nicola Mauro Parenti as Count Guy Norton / Fenomenal
 Lucretia Love as Lucretia Perkins
 Gordon Mitchell as Gregory Falkov
 John Karlsen as Prof. Mickewitz
 Carla Romanelli as Anna Guillaume

Production
Phenomenal and the Treasure of Tutankhamen was directed by Ruggero Deodato under the name of Roger Rockfeller. Deodato later stated on his name choice that he thought ""a rich man's name...so who is a rich guy? Rockfeller!" See, I was as dumb as a rock." Deodato has a cameo in the film as the man who falls off a bicycle. The producer of the film was Nicola Mauro Parenti who also starred in the film as the main character Count Guy Norton and Fenomenal. On his acting, Deodato mentioned that he was "too stiff, a dog of an actor; I treated him like shit on the set, but then he called me again for Zenabel." Deodato mentioned that the producer often dealt with people who requested small roles in the film in exchange for funding.

Among the cast is Parenti's wife Lucretia Love. The film was shot in Rome and Paris. While shooting in Paris on the Champs Elysées, while panning across the crowd gathering to see President Charles de Gaulle, among the crowd was Rex Harrison.

Release
Phenomenal and the Treasure of Tutankhamen was released in Italy in 1968.

Reception
Deodato spoke negatively about the film in later interviews, mentioning in 2008 that he "didn't give a shit about the film."

From retrospective reviews, Roberto Curti described it as "one of the lamest, less remarkable entries in the supercriminal/superherotrend of the late 60s" with a storyline "so confused it is difficult to tell what is going on at times." Curti noted that the best thing about the film was the score by Bruno Nicolai.

See also
 List of Italian films of 1968

References

Footnotes

Sources

External links
 
 Phenomenal and the Treasure of Tutankhamen at Variety Distribution

1968 films
Films directed by Ruggero Deodato
Italian superhero films
Films shot in Paris
Films set in Paris
Films shot in Rome
Film superheroes
1960s superhero films
1960s Italian films